Citadels is a real-time strategy video game developed by Games Distillery and published by bitComposer Games. Based on a loose interpretation of the King Arthur tale, players are tasked with restoring the honor, glory and reign of the Arthurian line. With two separate campaigns, players are given the choice of seeing the Good or Evil side of the war, as they carve a path into an uncertain future for the King and his loyal men. Upon the successful completion of in-game side-quests, players will be rewarded with legendary heroes for use in the main campaign.
 
It was released on July 25, 2013 for Windows via Steam. The game was met with negative reception.

Plot 
The game is set during the fall of King Arthur's reign. His Kingdom loses to an invading force backed by Mordred and Morgan.

Gameplay

Reception 

Citadels was met with negative reception. It has a Metacritic score of 20.

Common complaints, associated with Citadels, include "pathing"  issues, basic real-time strategy features missing or underdeveloped, basic commands are very unresponsive, tedious gameplay elements and poor tutorial and in-game instructions.

References

External links 
 
 

2013 video games
Real-time strategy video games
Video games developed in Slovakia
Video games based on Arthurian legend
Video games set in castles
Video games set in the Middle Ages
Windows games
Windows-only games
BitComposer Interactive games
Single-player video games